Pirqata (Aymara pirqa wall, -ta a suffix, also spelled Perkhata) is a mountain in the Cordillera Real in the Bolivian Andes. It is situated in the La Paz Department, Sud Yungas Province, Yanacachi Municipality. Pirqata lies north-east of the mountains Jathi Qullu and Sura Qullu and east of Sirk'i Qullu.

References 

Mountains of La Paz Department (Bolivia)